Where Stars Land is a South Korean television series starring Lee Je-hoon and Chae Soo-bin. It aired on SBS from October 1 to November 26, 2018 on Mondays and Tuesdays at 22:00 (KST) for 32 episodes.

Synopsis
It follows the lives of employees at Incheon International Airport.

Cast

Main
 Lee Je-hoon as Lee Soo-yeon (29 years old)
Nam Da-reum as young Lee Soo-yeon
 A first-year member of the Passenger Services team. He graduated from the prestigious KAIST and dreamed of becoming a pilot, but due to an accident he could not fulfill his dream.  A mysterious man who harbors a secret that causes him to keep his distance from his coworkers.
 Chae Soo-bin as Han Yeo-reum (27 years old)
 A first-year member of the Passenger Services team. She strives to be a perfectionist but makes many mistakes due to clumsiness and a tendency to let her emotions get the better of her.
 Lee Dong-gun as Seo In-woo (37 years old)
 Team manager of Airport Planning and Operation. His father and Lee Soo-yeon's mother were remarried, making him the step-brother of Lee Soo-yeon.
 Kim Ji-soo as Yang Seo-koon (41 years old)
 Team manager of Passenger Services. She knows everything about Lee Soo-yeon from the beginning. She thinks of Lee Soo-yeon as her brother because Soo-yeon often reminds her of her younger brother Yang Ji-hoon.

Supporting
Passenger Service Team
 Jang Hyun-sung as Kwon Hee-seung
 Director of Terminal 2 (T2) of Incheon International Airport.
 Ahn Sang-woo as Gong Seung-cheol (40 years old)
Manager of Passenger Service Team. He  is married and has a teenage daughter.

Security Service Team
 Lee Sung-wook as Choi Moo-ja
 Manager of Security Service Team. He is also the husband of Passenger Services team manager Yang Seo-koon.
 Kim Kyung-nam as Oh Dae-ki (31 years old)
 Head Officer at Security Service Team. He is kind and soft from heart though he appears as rough and tough. Dae-ki has one-sided love for his team junior, Na Young-joo.
 Lee Soo-kyung as Na Young-joo (28 years old)
 She is Oh Dae-ki's assistant. Young-joo is a former judo athlete. She is hard-working and ambitious. She and Han Yeo-Reum become roommates.

Mooring Management Team
 Kim Won-hae as Park Tae-hee
 Manager of Airport Mooring Management Team.
 Rowoon as Ko Eun-sub (29 years old)
 Han Yeo-reum's close friend. He has one-sided love for Yeo-reum and supports her in every way.
 Ha Ji-eun as Si Jae-in

Staff of Incheon Airport
 Jeong Jae-sung as Lee Woo-taek
Team Manager of Transportation Services.
 Hong Ji-min as Heo Young-ran
Team Manager of Commercial Facilities.
 Kim Joon-won as Mo Jeong-hoon
Team Manager of Incheon International Airport Integrated Operations (IOC).

Others
 Park Hyuk-kwon as Mister Zhang
Owner of Fox Bride Star cafe. He is also a doctor who is trying to cure Lee Soo-yeon.
 Choi Won-young as Han Jae-young
Han Yeo-reum's father. He is the former owner of Fox Bride Star cafe.
 Kim Yeo-jin as Yoon Hye-won
Han Yeo-reum's mother. She used to live in Nigeria.
Lee Seul-a
 Park Ji-il as homeless man (Seo In-woo's father)

Special appearances
 Yoon Kyung-ho as unreasonable customer (ep. 1)
 Ejay Falcon as Ian Santos (ep. 7-8)
 Yoon Ji-on as Security check employee	
 Lauren Young as Mari (ep. 7-8)
 Im Won-hee as gift shop employee (ep. 17)
 Ahn Chang-Hwan as husband of airport employee (ep. 22)

Production
 The series is the second collaboration between screenwriter Kang Eun-kyung and director Shin Woo-cheol after the 2013 series Gu Family Book.
 Early working title of the series is Incheon Airport People.
 The lead roles were first offered to Hyun Bin and Park Shin-hye, then to Park Bo-gum and Bae Suzy, but they all declined.
 The first script reading took place on July 28, 2018 at SBS Ilsan Production Studios in Goyang, Gyeonggi Province, South Korea.

Original soundtrack

Part 1

Part 2

Part 3

Part 4

Part 5

Part 6

Part 7

Part 8

Viewership

Awards and nominations

Notes

References

External links
  
 
 Where Stars Land at Kim Jong-hak Production
 Where Stars Land at Samhwa Networks

Seoul Broadcasting System television dramas
Korean-language television shows
2018 South Korean television series debuts
2018 South Korean television series endings
South Korean romance television series
South Korean melodrama television series
Television shows written by Kang Eun-kyung
Television shows set in Incheon
South Korean workplace television series
Television series by Samhwa Networks
Television series by Kim Jong-hak Production